The Kinistin Saulteaux Nation is a Saulteaux band government in Saskatchewan. The Kinistin Saulteaux Nation is a signatory of Treaty No. 4, which was signed by Chief Yellow-quill on August 24, 1876.

Total registered population in February, 2009, was 913, of which the on-reserve population was 328 members.  The First Nation is a member of the Saskatoon Tribal Council and have their urban offices in Saskatoon as well as their Tribal Council offices.

History 
The First Nation was originally part of the Yellow-quill Saulteaux Band, a Treaty Band named after a Treaty 4 signatory Chief Ošāwaškokwanēpi, whose name means "Green/Blue-quill."  However, due to "š" merging with "s" in Nakawēmowin (Saulteaux language), this led to a mistranslation of his name as "Yellow-quill"—"yellow" being osāw-, while "green/blue" being ošāwaško- (or osāwasko- in Saulteaux). Kinistin is named after Chief Kiništin ("Cree"), one of the headmen for Chief Ošāwaškokwanēpi. Chief Kiništin came to Saskatchewan from Western Ontario along with his two brothers, Miskokwanep ("Red [Crow-]Feather") and Mehcihcākanihs ("Coyote"). In 1901, lands were set aside for the Kinistin Band. Soon after the death of Chief Ošāwaškokwanēpi, the Yellow-quill Saulteaux Band divided into three groups, with the group originally headed by Chief Kiništin becoming the Kinistin Saulteaux Nation.

Reserves
The First Nation have reserved for themselves three reserves:
  Kinistin Reserve 91, which serves as their main Reserve.
  Kinistin Reserve 91A
  Treaty Four Reserve Grounds (Indian Reserve 77), which is shared with 32 other First Nations.

Governance 
Kinistin have an elected tribal council consisting of a chief and five councilors.  The current council for the two-year-long electoral term ending in April 2019, consists of Chief Felix Thomas and Councillors Wayne J. Thomas, Joseph Smokeyday, Cecil McNab and Craig Thomas.

References

External links

First Nations in Saskatchewan